This is a list of public holidays in the Central African Republic

Public holidays

References 

Central African Republic
Central African Republic culture
Central African Republic